The Mexican Navy is one of the two independent armed forces of Mexico. The actual naval forces are called the Armada de México. The Secretaría de Marina (SEMAR) (English: Naval Secretariat) includes both the Armada itself and the attached ministerial and civil service. The commander of the Navy is the Secretary of the Navy, who is both a cabinet minister and a career naval officer.

The Mexican Navy's stated mission is "to use the naval force of the federation for external defense, and to help with internal order". As of 2020, the Navy consists of about 68,200 men and women plus reserves, over 189 ships, and about 130 aircraft. The Navy attempts to maintain a constant modernization program to upgrade its response capability.

Given Mexico's large area of water and extensive coastline, the Navy's duties are of great importance. Perhaps its most important on-going missions are the war on drugs and protecting PEMEX's oil wells in Campeche in the Gulf of Mexico. Another important task of the Mexican Navy is to help people in hurricane relief operations and other natural disasters.

The Mexican navy is the second largest navy in Latin America and North America, and the third largest in the Americas after the United States and Brazil.

History

The Mexican Navy has its origins in the creation of the Ministry of War in 1821. From that year until 1939 it existed jointly with the Mexican Army in the organic ministry. Since its declaration of independence from Spain in September 1810, through the mid decades of the 19th century, Mexico found itself in a constant state of war, mostly against Spain which had not recognized its independence. Therefore, its priority was to purchase its first fleet from the U.S. to displace the last remaining Spanish forces from its coasts.

The Mexican Navy has participated in many naval battles to protect and defend Mexico's interests. Some of the most important battles were:

Attempts by Spain to reconquer Mexico
 Takeover of the San Juan de Ulúa fort (1821–1825)
 The invasion of Cabo Rojo (1829)
 Battle of Mariel (February, 1828)
The first French intervention in Mexico (The 'Pastry War') (November 1838 – March 1839)
 An entire Armada was captured at Veracruz
Texan Independence (1836–1845)
 Texas Navy
Yucatán Independence (1841–1848)
 Naval Battle of Campeche
The Mexican–American War (1846–1848)
The Second French Intervention (1862–1867)
The Mexican Revolution (1910–1919)
 First Battle of Topolobampo
 Second Battle of Topolobampo
 Third Battle of Topolobampo
 Action of 9 April 1914
 Fourth Battle of Topolobampo
Second invasion by the United States (April 9, 1914 – November 23, 1914)
 United States occupation of Veracruz

Historical ships

 Schooner Anáhuac
 Schooner Iguala

 Cutter Campechana
 Cutter Chalco
 Cutter Chapala
 Cutter Orizaba
 Cutter Texcoco
 Cutter Zumpango
 Cutter Papaloapan
 Cutter Tampico
 Cutter Tlaxcalteca
 Cutter Tuxpan
 Ship Congreso Mexicano (previously called Asia and San Jerónimo)
 Brigantine Constante
 Brigantine Vicente Guerrero
 Steamer paddle frigate Guadalupe
 Steamer paddle frigate Montezuma
 Steamer gunboat Libertad

 Steamer gunboat Independencia
 Steamer Guerra Demócrata
 Steam yacht Orizaba
 Gunboat Democráta
 Gunboat México
 Corvette 
 School ship Yucatán
 Pontoon Chetumal
 Gunboat Tampico
 Gunboat Veracruz
 Gunboat Nicolás Bravo
 Transport vessel Progreso
 Transport Vicente Guerrero
 Gunboat Agua Prieta
 Coastal defence Battleship Anáhuac
 Auxiliary ship Zaragoza II
 School ship Velero Cuauhtémoc

Organization
The President of Mexico is commander in chief of all military forces. Day-to-day control of the Navy lies with the Navy Secretary, José Rafael Ojeda Durán. In Mexico there is no joint force command structure with the army, so the Secretary reports directly to the President. The Navy has a General Headquarters and three naval forces. There are furthermore eight regions (four on the Pacific coast, three on the Mexican Gulf coast and the Región Naval Central, grouping the naval forces, based in and around the capital Mexico City, such as the 7th Naval Infantry Brigade, the Central Special Operations Group and the Air Transport Squadron), thirteen zones, and fourteen naval sectors.

The Navy is divided into three main services designated as "forces":
 Gulf and Caribbean Sea Naval Force
 Pacific Naval Force
 Naval Infantry Force

Other notable services include:
 Naval Aviation
 Search and Rescue

Officers are trained at the Mexican Naval Academy, called the "Heroica Escuela Naval Militar" ("Heroic Military Naval School"), located in Antón Lizardo, Veracruz.

Naval Infantry

The Mexican Naval Infantry Corps was reorganized in 2007–2009 into 30 Naval Infantry Battalions (Batallones de Infantería de Marina – BIM), a paratroop battalion, a battalion attached to the Presidential Guard Brigade, two Fast Reaction Forces with six battalions each, and three Special Forces groups. The Naval Infantry are responsible for port security, protection of the ten-kilometer coastal fringe, and patrolling major waterways.

The Naval Infantry also is responsible for 23 National Service Training Units under the responsibility of the Navy Secretary, enforcing the National Service obligation for Mexicans of teenage and young adult age.

Naval Aviation

Search and rescue units

In 2008, the Mexican Navy created its new search and rescue system, allocated in strategic ports at Pacific and Gulf of Mexico ports,
to provide assistance to any ships which are in jeopardy or at risk due to mechanical failure, weather conditions or life risk to the crew. To provide such support, the Navy has ordered Coast Guard Defender class ships (two per station, and one 47-Foot Motor Lifeboat coast guard vessel). Other stations will be provided only with s.

Maritime role
On April 1, 2014, SEMAR officially announced the creation of Port Protection Naval Units (Unidades Navales de Protección Portuaria: UNAPROP) which will include a marine section. The main task of UNAPROPs is to ensure maritime surveillance and inspection.

Training and education

The Navy offers several options for graduate studies in their educational institutions:

Heroica Escuela Naval Militar
It is the school where future officers are trained for the General Corps of the Navy. Candidates can enter upon completing high school. Upon completion of studies, graduates obtain the degree of Sub-Lieutenant and the title of Naval Science Engineer.

Naval Medical School
This school Located in Mexico City, offers a career in medicine. Officers are trained with skills for the prevention and health care of naval personnel. By adopting a professional examination, graduates are commissioned Sub-Lieutenants.

Naval Engineering School
In the Naval Engineering School, officers are responsible for the preventive and corrective maintenance of systems and electronic equipment installed on ships and installations of the Mexican Navy. This school offers career of Electronic Engineering and Naval Communications. It is located between the town of Mata Grape and Anton Lizardo,  from the port of Veracruz.

Naval Nursing School
Here the time to achieve a nursing degree lasts eight semesters. Officers are trained with the knowledge and skills necessary to enable them to assist medical personnel in caring for patients in hospitals, sanatoriums, clinics, health sections on land, aboard ships and at The Naval Medical Center.

Naval Aviation School
The Naval Aviation School trains pilots for the Mexican Naval Aviation as well as staff from the Federal Preventive Police and Naval personnel from various countries of Central America. This school is located on La Paz, Baja California Sur.

Search, Rescue and Diving School
Located in Acapulco, members of The Navy are trained for marine search, rescue and diving. It also trains state police officers and firefighters.

Rank insignia

Modernization and budget
The annual Navy's budget is in a one to three proportion of the national budget relative to the Mexican Army and Mexican Air Force. The Navy has a reputation for being well-run and well-organized. This reputation allows for a close relationship with the United States Navy (USN), as evidenced by the procurement of numerous former USN ships.

Ships
The Secretary of the Navy, Admiral Mariano Francisco Saynez Mendoza, announced on October 1, 2007, detailed plans to upgrade and modernize the country's naval capabilities. The budget for this project is above US$200 million.

Another project is to build 12 CB 90 HMN high speed interception boats under license from a Swedish boat company Dockstavarvet to the Mexican Navy. Also, a number of fully equipped planes for surveillance and maritime patrol are being considered. Combinations of options and development are being defined.

Shipbuilding

The Mexican Navy depends upon their naval shipyards for construction and repairs of their ships. There are five shipyards located in the Gulf of Mexico and Pacific Ocean:
 Gulf of Mexico
 Naval shipyard 1 (ASTIMAR 1) – Tampico, Tamaulipas
 Naval shipyard 3 (ASTIMAR 3) – Coatzacoalcos, Veracruz
 Pacific Ocean
 Naval shipyard 6 (ASTIMAR 6) –  Guaymas, Sonora
 Naval shipyard 18 (ASTIMAR 18) – Acapulco, Guerrero
 Naval shipyard 20 (ASTIMAR 20) – Salina Cruz, Oaxaca

Missiles
The undersecretary added that they already had the solid propellant, and the basic design of the missile. All aspects relative to their fuselage were solved as well as the launch platforms. The Mexican Navy was developing the software to direct the missile to its target. In July 2008, the project was reported to be 80% complete. Despite this effort, the missile development was canceled in 2009 due to "problems with the propulsion system".

Radar modernization
In 2009, the Mexican Navy began operating a batch of new MPQ-64 Sentinel radars in the oil-rich Gulf of Mexico. The radar network was installed in 2007 for a trial phase while military personnel were trained to get familiar with the system. The new installations will work together with combat surface vessels that patrol the area.

Present fleet

The Mexican Navy includes 60 smaller patrol boats and 32 auxiliary ships. It acquired 40 fast military assault crafts, designated CB 90 HMN, between 1999 and 2001 and obtained a production license in 2002, enabling further units to be manufactured in Mexico.

Modern equipment

Individual weapons and equipment

Artillery

Aircraft inventory

Future

For the year 2008 budget, the Mexican Congress approved a US$15 million fund to build only 17 out of the 60 combat boats requested. These ships, designated CB 90 HMN, are to increase the Mexican Navy's fast boat fleet. Additional budgets will be awarded each passing year. In total, the Mexican Navy has over 189 operational ships.

The offer expired on January 1, 2016.

2014

On March 25, 2014 Beechcraft Corporation received an order of 2 T-6C+ military trainers from the Mexican Navy.

On June 24, 2014, the Mexican Government requested the purchase of 5 UH-60Ms in USG configuration from the U.S.; its estimated cost is $225 million. Also on June 24, BAE Systems announced it was awarded a contract by the Mexican Government to supply the navy with 4 Mk 3 57mm naval guns, for the ships of the Reformador class.

See also
 Military of Mexico
 Mexican Naval Aviation
 Symphonic Orchestra and Chorus of the Secretariat of the Navy of Mexico

References

External links
 Secretary of the Navy Official site (Spanish)
 Naval Infantry official site (Spanish)

 
Military of Mexico